Capon Lake is an unincorporated community in Hampshire County of West Virginia's Eastern Panhandle region. Capon Lake is situated between Yellow Spring and Intermont at the junction of West Virginia Route 259 and Capon Springs Road (West Virginia Secondary Route 16) along the Cacapon River. Capon Springs Run empties into the Cacapon here across from the old Capon Lake Whipple Truss Bridge. Capon Lake takes its name from the Cacapon River's lake-like characteristics there. It was a popular picnic spot for tourists and travelers on the Winchester and Western Railroad.

Historic site 

Capon Lake Whipple Truss Bridge (1874), along WV Route 259, Listed on the National Register of Historic Places in 2011.

References

External links

Unincorporated communities in Hampshire County, West Virginia
Unincorporated communities in West Virginia